Sawdon is a village in the civil parish of Brompton in the Scarborough district of North Yorkshire, England, about  west of Scarborough. As the population is less than 100, details are included in the data for Brompton Parish.

It lies at the northern edge of the Vale of Pickering with Hackness Forest and the North York Moors National Park directly to the north of the village.

Whilst the village is not mentioned specifically by name in the Domesday Book, its name is recorded as far back as 1290 as Saldene, which means Sallow Valley. However, the manor of Sawdon was included in the Domesday survey for the area in and around Brompton. No churches were built in the village, but in 1823, a Wesleyan chapel was erected on the main road through the settlement. This is now a private dwelling.

From 2012 Sawdon Village Hall was selected as the site for fundraising events by the charity Astronomy Wise. These events see a large gathering of astronomers and visitors at the building throughout the year. Regular meetings usually take place on the second Friday of every month excluding the summer months.

See also
Sawdon railway station

References

External links

Villages in North Yorkshire